April was a South Korean girl group formed by DSP Media. The group debuted on August 24, 2015, with their EP Dreaming and its title track "Dream Candy". The group's final lineup was composed of six members: Chaekyung, Chaewon, Naeun, Yena, Rachel and Jinsol. The group officially disbanded on January 28, 2022.

Name
The group name is made up of 'A' and 'pril'. 'A' means 'the best girl group' and 'pril' means lovely girls. As combined, 'April' makes the meaning of 'the best, lovely girls'. Also known as 'Sa-wori' (사월이, April), 'Apple' (에플, pun of April) or 'Pril-e' (프릴이, pun of pril). After their debut, fans started calling them 'Chung-jeong-dol' (청정돌, pure idol).

History

2015: Debut and Somin's departure

April's formation was first announced by DSP Media on February 9, 2015, following their previous girl groups Fin.K.L, Kara and Rainbow. The six-member group (Somin, Chaewon, Hyunjoo, Naeun, Yena, and Jinsol) debuted on August 24 with the EP Dreaming and the title track "Dream Candy".

On November 9, the group's leader, Somin, announced her departure from the group, admitting she was uncomfortable with the concept the group would pursue; she would later go on to debut in the co-ed group KARD. The remaining five members released the single album Boing Boing, including the title track "Muah!" and the B-side "Glass Castle" on November 25. It was followed by a Christmas special album titled Snowman, released on December 21.

2016: Spring and line-up changes
On February 12, 2016, DSP Media announced that the group's fan club name was "Fineapple". On February 14, the group hold a mini-concert titled "Everland Romantic Concert" for Valentine's Day. On February 18, April won the Girl Group Rookie of the Year award at the 22nd Korean Entertainment Arts Awards.

The group's second EP, Spring, was released on April 27. It contains six tracks including the lead single, "Tinkerbell". During promotions for Spring, Hyunjoo took a temporary hiatus from the group due to health issues, and April promoted as a four-member group.

On August 21, the group held their first solo concert, titled Dream Land, at the Baek Am Art Hall in Seoul, to celebrate their first anniversary. Another concert was held in Tokyo, Japan, on October 15. Yoon Chae-kyung also participated in both concerts as a guest member.

On October 29, Hyunjoo announced her departure from April, following a seven-month hiatus, in order to pursue an acting career. New group members were confirmed in November: Chaekyung, who had previously appeared as a guest member, and Rachel.

2017: Prelude, Mayday and Eternity 

April released their third EP Prelude as a six-member group on January 3, 2017, with the title track "April Story". The group also held their comeback showcase performance for Prelude on the same day. On February 14, they performed a cover of Apink's "Luv" for the 100th episode of The Show. From February 16, they also performed on M Countdown with the track "Wow". On February 26, they released "So You" as a digital single. On March 20, April held their second Japanese fan-meeting titled "[#April Japan Fanmeeting 2017～April Story～]" at Shinagawa Intercity Hall, Tokyo.

On April 4, they released the tennis-court-themed music video for the single "Sting", through the first episode of their reality program A-IF-Ril. The program aired for five episodes. On May 8, the group's second reality program of the year, April Secret, began airing on Naver TV.

On May 29, April released their second single album, Mayday. The music video for "Sting" was re-released under the title "Lovesick", along with the title track "Mayday". They performed "Lovesick" on M Countdown on June 22.

On September 20, their fourth EP Eternity was released along with the title track "Take My Hand" .

On October 18, it was announced that the group will hold their second Japanese solo concert titled "April 2nd Live Concert in Japan 2017
「Dream Land」 (Take My Hand)" on December 10, 2017. The group also performed a concert in Korea on Christmas Day titled "2017 SPECIAL CHRISTMAS APRIL EVE".

2018: The Blue, Japanese debut and The Ruby 

On January 30, 2018, DSP Media through the group's Twitter revealed the upcoming secret single set to release for February 7. On January 31, the agency revealed that the single was to be part of a special unit album. On February 1, it was revealed that the upcoming subunit consisting of members Jinsol and Naeun would release a song "My Story".

On February 26, 2018, DSP Media confirms that April's full group comeback was set for March 12, with the group's fifth EP The Blue along with the title track "The Blue Bird" .

On March 22, DSP Media announced that April was set to make its Japanese debut sometime during the following month. The group made their Japanese debut on April 25 with the release of the Japanese version of their 2016 single "Tinkerbell". The single also contains the Japanese version of the b-side track "Yes, sir!" as well as the instrumental version of both songs. The single was promoted through TV shows appearances and a series of fan-meetings in various cities of Japan.

On September 17, the news outlet OSEN released an exclusive report about APRIL making a fall comeback. The reports were later confirmed by the group's youngest member Jinsol who revealed during an interview that the group was indeed preparing for a comeback. On October 4, DSP Media confirmed that the group would come back with their sixth EP The Ruby. The album was released on October 16, along with the title track "Oh! My Mistake".

2019–2020: Japanese comeback, Da Capo, and Hello Summer
On January 16, 2019, April released the single "Oh-E-Oh (Japanese ver.)". In the same month, they released "Magic Dream" for the television drama My Strange Hero.

On March 11, 2020, DSP Media announced that April would postpone their March comeback to April 2020 amid the coronavirus concerns. On April 10, it was revealed that April would make a comeback with their 7th EP titled Da Capo on April 22. According to DSP Media, "Da Capo" is a musical term which means "from the beginning". On April 22, Da Capo and its title track "Lalalilala" were released. Da Capo peaked at number five on the Gaon Album Chart, while "Lalalilala" peaked at number 40 on the Gaon Digital Chart, becoming their highest-charting releases to date.

On July 14, 2020, DSP Media announced that April would make a summer comeback with the special single album Hello Summer on July 29, with the title track "Now or Never".

2021–2022: Bullying accusations and disbandment 
On February 28, 2021, a post was made to an online forum by someone claiming to be former member Hyunjoo's brother. In the post, he claimed that Hyunjoo's departure from the group had not been because she wanted to study acting, but because she had been forced out due to being severely bullied by the other members, at one point even attempting suicide. DSP Media has denied that any bullying took place, and announced they would be pursuing legal action against Hyunjoo and her family. As a result, the group has faced heavy backlash, up to and including having members removed from endorsement deals and acting roles. Hyunjoo then posted a statement on her personal Instagram on April 18, 2021 backing the claims of the two netizens who made the accusations. She also stated that the label, DSP Media, was not allowing her to terminate her exclusive contract with them.

On January 28, 2022, after a year of no activities, and following the acquisition of DSP by RBW Entertainment on January 26, DSP Media announced that April has decided to disband after six years and go their separate ways. The decision was made after a long discussion and deliberation.

Members
 Chaekyung
 Somin 
 Chaewon
 Hyunjoo
 Naeun
 Yena 
 Rachel
 Jinsol

Discography

Extended plays 
 Dreaming (2015)
 Spring (2016)
 Prelude (2017)
 Eternity (2017)
 The Blue (2018)
 The Ruby (2018)
 Da Capo (2020)

Filmography

Television

Awards and nominations

References

External links

 
K-pop music groups
Musical groups established in 2015
Musical groups disestablished in 2022
South Korean girl groups
South Korean dance music groups
Musical groups from Seoul
2015 establishments in South Korea
2022 disestablishments in South Korea
DSP Media artists
Musical quintets